Gay lingo may refer to several languages spoken by gay communities:

 Swardspeak or Beki language, a cant slang used by gay communities in the Philippines
 Polari, cant slang used in Britain
 Bahasa Binan, an argot spoken by gay communities in Indonesia
 Gayle language, an Afrikaans-based argot spoken by gay communities in South Africa
 IsiNgqumo, an argot based on the Bantu languages spoken by gay communities in South Africa
 Kaliarda, it is an argot spoken by the gay communities in Greece
 LGBT slang
 Lubunca, an argot used in Turkey

See also
 Lavender linguistics
 Cant (language)